JRL may refer to:
 Japan national rugby league team
 Java Research License, a software distribution license
 Johnson's Russia List, an email newsletter
 Juan Ramón Loubriel Stadium, in Bayamón, Puerto Rico
 Jurong Region MRT line, a planned mass transit line for Singapore
 Jurong Regional Library, a regional library in Jurong East, Singapore